Sanxiang (Cantonese: Sāamhēung Jan) is a town situated at the southern periphery of the city of Zhongshan, Guangdong province. The population of Sanxiang is  permanent residents and an estimated  temporary residents. Sanxiang is much closer to Zhuhai than central Zhongshan.

Economics

Primary industries
Injection moulding, toolmaking, imaging supplies

Culture
Sanxiang is one of the less busy parts of Zhongshan.
It is a little known oasis of weekend homes for Hong Kong and Macau residents and a retirement haven for people from all over China.

Notable individuals
Zheng Junli
Zheng Guanying (鄭觀應/郑观应)

See also
Sanxiang dialect

External links
Sanxiang Township Government Website

Zhongshan
Township-level divisions of Guangdong